Fahai Temple Forest Park is one of the largest public parks within the 6th Ring Road of Beijing. It is located near the Cuiwei Mountain, in the Moshikou region of Shijingshan District, which is in the western part of central Beijing.

Fahai Temple was constructed during the reign of Zhengtong Emperor of Ming Dynasty, and it is the home to one of the best preserved Ming Dynasty's buddhist frescoes in China. In 1987, the Shijingshan government created a forest park around the temple. The forest park provides people a good place to enjoy the nature, and to view ancient architectures, special species and geological landforms.

Parks in Beijing